Constance of Austria (24 December 1588 – 10 July 1631) was Queen of Poland as the second wife of King Sigismund III Vasa and the mother of King John II Casimir.

Biography
Constance was a daughter of Charles II of Austria and Maria Anna of Bavaria. Her paternal grandparents were Ferdinand I, Holy Roman Emperor and Anna of Bohemia and Hungary (1503–1547). Anne was the only daughter of King Vladislaus II of Bohemia and Hungary and his wife Anne de Foix. Her maternal grandparents were Albert V, Duke of Bavaria and Anne Habsburg of Austria.

Constance was also a younger sister of Ferdinand II, Holy Roman Emperor, Margaret of Austria, Leopold V of Austria and Anna of Austria.

Her older sister Anna was the first wife of King Sigismund III Vasa. After her death Constance and Sigismund were married on December 11, 1605.

They had seven children:

John Casimir (25 December 1607 – 14 January 1608).
John Casimir (22 March 1609 – 16 December 1672), who reigned during 1648–1668 as John II Casimir.
John Albert (25 June 1612 – 29 December 1634).
Charles Ferdinand (13 October 1613 – 9 May 1655).
Alexander Charles (4 November 1614 – 19 November 1634).
Anna Constance (26 January 1616 – 24 May 1616).
Anna Catherine Constance (7 August 1619 – 8 October 1651).

Queen Constance was an ambitious politician. Immediately after the wedding, she made efforts to influence policy. She built a strong faction of followers by arranging marriages between her handmaidens and powerful nobles. She represented the interests of the Habsburg family in Poland, and influenced the appointments of positions in the court, government and church. Her closest confidant was Urszula Meyerin.

Constance was proficient in Spanish, Latin and Italian. She learned Polish after the wedding but rarely used it. She was very religious and went to Mass twice a day. She also was a patron of clerics, painters and architects. She financed the buildings of several palaces for her children, but she was also described as an economic person.

In 1623 Constance bought Żywiec from Mikołaj Komorowski, which was forbidden by law to the members of the Royal Family and caused misunderstandings with the Parliament. Some time later (in 1626) she made it forbidden for Jews to settle in the city (de non tolerandis Judaeis).

Constance wished to secure the succession of her own son to the throne rather than the son of her sister, but she did not succeed. She died of a stroke in 1631.

Ancestors

Gallery

See also

Urszula Meyerin
Golub-Dobrzyń

References

External links
 The Stockholm Roll, Entry of the Wedding Procession of Constance of Austria and Sigismund III into Kraków in 1605.

1588 births
1631 deaths
Polish queens consort
Prussian royal consorts
17th-century House of Habsburg
Austrian princesses
Grand Duchesses of Lithuania
Burials at Wawel Cathedral
Polish Roman Catholics
Daughters of monarchs